is a traditional Noh play. It is considered a very auspicious story, involving a loving and long-married couple.

During the play a singer chants, "From Takasago, sailing over the bay, sailing over the bay, the moon goes out with the tide, past the silhouette of Awaji Island, far over the sea to Naruo, arriving at Suminoe, arriving at Suminoe", referencing several places in what are now Hyōgo and Osaka Prefectures. This is considered a classic Noh chant, taken from a classical poem signifying harmony between husband and wife.

Plot
A priest from the Kyushu Aso Shrine arrives at Takasago. The spring weather is pleasant and the pine trees are beautiful. In the distance he hears a bell toll. An elderly couple arrive and begin to sweep the area under the pine bower. The old man recites a poem from the Kokin Wakashū (Collection of Ancient and Modern Poems), a collection of waka poetry. The poem describes Takasago and Sumioe , paired pine trees that, according to legend, will remain together for eternity. He explains that these wedded pines are a symbol of the marital relationship. The priest says that all relationships, indeed all life, falls short of the ideal expressed in the poem.

At this point, the old couple reveal that they are the spirits of the Takasago and Sumioe pines, and they set sail across the bay in a small boat. As the tide goes out, the priest also sets sail, at which point the "From Takasago, sailing over the bay..." chant is recited.

Takasago Shrine

According to Takasago Shrine in Takasago, Hyōgo, there have been aioi no matsu twin pines within its grounds since the  Shinto shrine was established. A pair of trees called Jō (尉 "old man") and Uba (姥 "old woman") – a Japanese form of Darby and Joan – bearing the legend, "We kami reside in these trees to show the world the way of marital virtue" stand within the shrine.

Notes

References

Noh plays